Robert Harvey (born 23 May 1955) is a Scottish former footballer who played as a forward. He played for Clyde during the 1970s, making 72 appearances (13 goals) in the Scottish Football League. He had played in an under-18 Schoolboy international for Scotland while a pupil at Holy Cross High School in Hamilton and later played at Junior level for Bellshill Athletic after leaving Clyde.

After retiring from playing, Harvey retained an interest in football. A supporter of Celtic raised in Rutherglen, he had a biography of Bobby Murdoch – from the same town and considered one of its finest sporting products, as well as one of the club's best ever players – published in 2010. Harvey also published a website inviting other residents of the town to nominate 'Rutherglen's Greatest Player' (Murdoch won the vote) and compiled the 15,000 responses in another book published in 2012. He also became a leading volunteer and contributor for the local Football Memories groups (an initiative to use sporting recollections to help combat dementia, a condition which afflicted his mother), and has helped to publicise the sport of walking football in the Glasgow area.

References

1955 births
Living people
Scottish footballers
Sportspeople from Rutherglen
Association football forwards
Clyde F.C. players
Scottish writers
Bellshill Athletic F.C. players
Scottish Football League players
Scottish Junior Football Association players
Scotland youth international footballers
People educated at Holy Cross High School, Hamilton
Footballers from South Lanarkshire